The Anaconda Smelter Stack is the tallest surviving masonry structure in the world, with an overall height of about , including a brick chimney  tall and the downhill side of a concrete foundation  tall. It is a brick smoke stack or chimney, built in 1918 as part of the Washoe Smelter of the Anaconda Copper Mining Company (ACM) at Anaconda, Montana, in the United States. A terra cotta coating covered the entire brick chimney when new, but by the time the smelter closed in 1981, most had eroded away except for the upper 40%, exposing most of its bricks and reinforcing rods. The stack and its viewing area are now the two-part Anaconda Smoke Stack State Park.

Dimensions

Brick chimney
This was the height when new in 1918, but loss of the terra cotta that covered the top course of bricks since then reduced its height one or more inches. The lowest  of the brick chimney is an octagon, the vertices of which point to the cardinal and intercardinal directions, north, northeast, east, etc., while its sides face the secondary-intercardinal directions, north-northeast, east-northeast, etc. Two large vertical openings are in the octagonal portion, each , on its east-southeast and south-southwest sides. When operational, the main flue carried hot exhaust gases to these openings and then into the stack from the smelter which was on the north side of the hill upon which the stack rests. The base of the octagon was   side to side across its bottom before the loss of its terra cotta covering. Its cylindrical portion plus the top  of the octagon are encircled by many large steel rods (called bands) for reinforcement. It has had 20 lightning rods around its rim since it was built (which are not included in its height). The stack contains 2,464,652 locally manufactured perforated tile bricks, each averaging 2.7 times larger by volume than the size of a normal brick.
Most are radial bricks that are curved to match a sector of a cylindrical wall. The brick chimney weighs .

Concrete foundation
The lowest part of the stack is a concrete foundation or footing that is built on sloped ground with a grade of  because it is just below the top of a hill. The stepped bottom of the foundation fits the stepped rock formation upon which it rests. The floor of the stack is generally conical leading  down below the brick chimney to a  rectangular grate, then into a  square horizontal duct that exits the stack at the center of the downhill side of the foundation on its south-southeast side. This allowed any valuable metal dust particles left in the flue gases that precipitated down to that conical floor to be collected by a car on a track within the duct and sent back to the smelter for more processing.

Construction
It was built by the Alphons Custodis Chimney Construction Company of New York (now Hamon Custodis) under the direction of W. C. Capron, mechanical superintendent of the Washoe Smelting Company. Much of the ore the smelter processed after 1955 came from the Berkeley Pit just north of Butte, Montana. At the time it was built, the stack was the tallest masonry, brickwork structure and chimney of any kind in the world and it remains the world's tallest surviving masonry structure. Taller masonry chimneys have existed but have since been demolished. Taller chimneys that still exist are made of reinforced concrete. See List of tallest chimneys.

The stack's brick portion is about  taller than the monument's 2015 height.
The masonry portion of the stack is about  taller than the above ground portion of the monument's masonry, which disregards the monument's aluminum apex.

The stack was designed to discharge exhaust gases from the various roasting and smelting furnaces at the smelter. The smelter had a large network of exhaust flues from the furnaces that all fed a main flue, which carried them a half-mile south up the hill to the stack.

State park
The Washoe Smelter was demolished after its closure in 1981. The stack alone, however, remains standing because the citizens of Anaconda organized to "Save the Stack." It is commonly referred to as "The Stack" or "The Big Stack" and is a well-known landmark in western Montana. In 1986 it was designated the Anaconda Smoke Stack State Park. Although the site of the smelter underwent some environmental cleanup, the general public is not allowed access to the stack itself because the soil around it is still hazardous due to contamination by the toxic metalloid arsenic as well as copper, cadmium, lead and zinc. Terra cotta covered the entire surface of the chimney just as it covered its top; by the time of its closure, the bottom 60% had eroded, including the brick octagon, exposing its bricks and reinforcing rods. The terra cotta is now darker than the exposed bricks.

See also
Flue gas stack

Notes

References

External links

 Anaconda Smoke Stack State Park Montana Fish, Wildlife & Parks
 Smelter history in brief
 Anaconda Smelter Stack Atlas Obscura
 Revisiting Montana's Historic Landscape
 Superfund Site: Anaconda Co. Selter, Anaconda, MT

Chimneys in the United States
Industrial buildings completed in 1919
Towers completed in 1919
Industrial buildings and structures on the National Register of Historic Places in Montana
Protected areas established in 1986
State parks of Montana
Protected areas of Deer Lodge County, Montana
National Register of Historic Places in Deer Lodge County, Montana
1918 establishments in Montana
Smelter Stack